Lawton R. Burns (born 1951) is an American business theorist, Professor of Management and the Chairperson of the Health Care Management Department of The Wharton School of The University of Pennsylvania, and a Faculty Co-Director for the Roy and Diana Vagelos Program in Life Sciences and Management.

Career 
Burns received a BA in sociology and anthropology in 1971 from Haverford College. Following this, he received his MA in Sociology in 1976, his PhD in Sociology in 1981 and his MBA in Health Administration in 1984, all three from the University of Chicago.

Burns started his academic career at the Graduate School of Business of the University of Chicago, and moved to the College of Business Administration of the University of Arizona. From 1998 to 2002, he was a Visiting scholar in the Department of Preventive Medicine at the University of Wisconsin School of Medicine and Public Health. Since 1994, he has been the chairman of the Health Care Systems Department of Wharton, and since 2008 the James Joo-Jin Kim Professor of Health Care Management. Since 1999 he is also director of the Wharton Center for Health Management and Economics.

In 1999, he received an Investigator Award in Health Research Policy from the Robert Wood Johnson Foundation.

In 2013, Burns joined the Roy and Diana Vagelos Program in Life Sciences and Management as a Faculty Co-Director. Outside of his duties as professor, he performs consulting and speaking engagements.

Contributions 
Burns is known for having analyzed the bankruptcy of the Allegheny Health Education & Research Foundation, which owned the first medical school ever to go bankrupt. He has testified to the Federal Trade Commission about clinical integration and served as an expert witness for the Federal Trade Commission in its case against Evanston Northwestern Healthcare Medical Group.

Burns has analyzed physician-organization integration over the past twenty-five years. The last 13 years he spent studying the healthcare supply chain. He completed a book on supply chain management in the healthcare industry, The Health Care Value Chain (Jossey-Bass, 2002), and a recent analysis of alliances between imaging equipment makers and hospital systems. These studies focus on the strategic alliances and partnerships developing between pharmaceutical firms/distributors, disposable manufacturers, medical device manufacturers, group purchasing organizations, and organized delivery systems.  He has also edited The Business of Healthcare Innovation (Cambridge University Press, 2012) which analyzes the healthcare technology sectors globally: pharmaceuticals, biotechnology, medical devices, and information technology. He has served as lead editor of the 6th Edition of the major text, Healthcare Management: Organization Design & Behavior (Delmar, 2011). India’s Healthcare Industry, was published in 2014 (Cambridge University Press, 2014).

Publications 
Publications, a selection:
 2021 The U.S. Healthcare Ecosystem: Payers, Providers, Producers
 2018. Managing Discovery: Harnessing Creativity to Drive Biomedical Innovation, coauthored with Philip A. Rea and Mark V. Pauly
 2017: China's Healthcare System and Reform, co-edited with Gordon G. Liu
 2014: India's Healthcare Industry: Innovation in Delivery, Financing, and Manufacturing
 2012: The Business of Healthcare Innovation, 2nd Edition
 2002. The Health Care Value Chain: Producers, Purchasers, and Providers 
 2005. The Business of Healthcare Innovation 
 2006. History & Health Policy in the United States

References

External links 
 Lawton Burns home Page at wharton.upenn.edu

Living people
American business theorists
University of Pennsylvania faculty
Year of birth uncertain
1951 births